GNOME LaTeX (up to version 3.26 known as LaTeXila) was a TeX/LaTeX editor to edit TeX/LaTeX documents. It ran on Linux systems with the GTK library installed.

Features
GNOME LaTeX had many useful features needed to edit TeX/LaTeX source code, such as: 
 Customizable one-click buttons to build, view and convert documents
 Auto-completion of (La)TeX commands
 Graphical lists of symbols for easy insertion
 Templates for new document creation
 Project management
 Summary of the document structure
 Spell checking based on gspell
 Forward and backward search to switch between the sources and the PDF

However, it lacked some features available in other editors:
 Split screen (available in TeXShop, Vim-LaTeX (LaTeX-suite), TeXmacs...)
 Compare (available in WinEdt, Vim-LaTeX (LaTeX-suite), TeXmacs...).

See also
 List of text editors
 Comparison of text editors
 Comparison of TeX editors

References

External links
 https://wiki.gnome.org/Apps/GNOME-LaTeX
 https://gitlab.gnome.org/swilmet/gnome-latex

Free TeX editors
Linux TeX software
GNOME Applications
TeX editors that use GTK
TeX editors